Scott Cyrway is an American deputy sheriff and politician from Maine. Cyrway, a Republican from Benton, serves as State Senator from Maine's 16th District, representing the northern part of Kennebec, including the population center of Waterville and the immediate rural part of the county north of Waterville. He was first elected to the Maine State Senate in 2014 over incumbent Democrat Colleen Lachowicz of Waterville.

He began working in Kennebec County Sheriff's Office in 1992. He served as the State Coordinator for the Drug Abuse Resistance Education (D.A.R.E.) program for 22 years prior to serving in the Maine Senate. In the Senate, he served as Senate co-chair of the Veteran's and Legal Affairs Committee.

Maine state senate district 16 election, 2016
In the 2016 Maine state senate district 16 election, incumbent Scott Cryway faced Democratic rival Henry Beck. Cyrway won with 54.2% of the vote.

The primary election took place on June 14, 2016, and the general election was held on November 8, 2016. Scott Cyrway ran unopposed in the Republican primary.

Political positions

Ranked Choice Voting
Scott Cyrway opposes ranked choice voting.

References

Bibliography
"Scott W. Cyrway" Bangor Daily News

1955 births
Living people
Republican Party Maine state senators
People from Benton, Maine
University of Maine alumni
American deputy sheriffs
21st-century American politicians